Param Singh MBE (Punjabi: ਪਰਮ ਸਿੰਘ) (born in London, England) is a British business and technology consultant, philanthropist and reality television personality and has worked for various companies including the Ford Motor Company, Rolls-Royce, Sainsbury's and Accenture. He was appointed Member of the Order of the British Empire (MBE) in the 2019 New Years Honours

Career 

Singh has worked with Internet startup companies since 2011 after launching an online 'find a lawyer' website, similar to trip advisor. 

He is a founding member and spokesperson for City Sikhs which is a charity representing the interests of British Sikh professionals.

In 2019, Singh was included in six part BBC Two British comedy show The Ranganation as one of 25 members of the public who discuss news events of the week with show host Romesh Ranganathan.

Awards and recognition 
 Jul 2019: Awarded 'Man of the Year' at the British Indian Awards.
Jan 2019: Appointed a Member of the Most Excellent Order of the British Empire (MBE) and received the honour at Buckingham Palace from Queen Elizabeth II.
 Nov 2018: Honoured with an 'Inspiring Individual' award at the Faith and Belief Community Awards from the Lord-Lieutenant of Greater London, Sir Kenneth Olisa OBE.

Personal life 
In 2019, Singh claimed he and his friends of Asian heritage were barred from entering several clubs in Vienna - Prater Dome, Baku Lounge and Loco Bar - while on holiday due to alleged racial discrimination. Martin Fahmy, the manager of Baku Lounge, denied the claims, highlighting the racial diversity of his staff and other venue patrons. Fahmy citing a lack of reservation as the reason the group were turned away.

In 2013, Singh became the first Sikh to appear on UK dating game show Take Me Out In 2018, he appeared on the same show's 10th anniversary special.

Family 
Singh's grandfather Professor Sunder Singh was the first Sikh to graduate in mechanical engineering from the University of Sheffield in 1932. Professor Singh established a number of engineering institutions in Lahore, Punjab and Gujarat, including Lukhdhirji Engineering College on the request of H.H. Maharaja Shri Sir Lukhdhirji Waghji Sahib of Morvi in 1951.

Views 
Singh appears in the media to talk about the experience of British Asians in dating, diversity and interfaith related matters.

See also 
 List of British Sikhs

References 

Year of birth missing (living people)
Living people
Members of the Order of the British Empire
Alumni of the University of Sheffield
English mechanical engineers
21st-century British businesspeople
British technology company founders
Businesspeople from London
British businesspeople of Indian descent
Businesspeople in the pharmaceutical industry
English businesspeople in property
Accenture people
GSK plc people
Sainsbury's people
Rolls-Royce people
Ford people
Philanthropists from London
British community activists
Founders of charities
Trustees of charities
Social entrepreneurs
British investors
British people of Punjabi descent
Participants in British reality television series
Conservative Party (UK) people
British Sikhs
Khatri clans
British yogis
Qigong practitioners